Carlos Humberto Castaños Valenzuela (born 14 April 1977) is a Mexican politician affiliated with the PAN. As of 2013 he served as Deputy of the LXII Legislature of the Mexican Congress representing Sinaloa.

References

1977 births
Living people
Politicians from Sinaloa
People from Culiacán
National Action Party (Mexico) politicians
21st-century Mexican politicians
Universidad Iberoamericana alumni
Deputies of the LXII Legislature of Mexico
Members of the Chamber of Deputies (Mexico) for Sinaloa